Niklas Schlegel (born August 3, 1994) is a Swiss professional ice hockey goaltender currently playing for HC Lugano in the National League (NL).

Playing career
Schlegel made his National League (NL) debut with the ZSC Lions during the 2014–15 season.

After 8 seasons in the Lions organization, Schlegel joined SC Bern for the 2019–20 season on a two-year deal through the 2020–21 season. However, he was shipped to HC Lugano during the 2019 December international break.

International play
He was named to the Swiss national team for the 2017 IIHF World Championship.

References

External links

1994 births
Living people
SC Bern players
GCK Lions players
HC Lugano players
Swiss ice hockey goaltenders
Ice hockey people from Zürich
ZSC Lions players